Bangalore Baptist Hospital, Bangalore is a private hospital based in Hebbal, Bangalore, Karnataka, India. It started as an outpatient clinic in the mid-sixties by the Southern Baptist Convention and evolved to a 80-bed general hospital which was formally opened on 15 January 1973. Headed by Dr. Jasper McPhail, it was started in 1973 for rural Bangalore; today it has turned into a multi-specialty hospital. It conducts various undergraduate and post-graduate nursing, medical and allied health services educational programs. Presently, the hospital has 340 beds and is governed by Christian Medical College (CMC), Vellore.

References 

Hospitals in Bangalore
Hospitals established in 1973
1973 establishments in Karnataka